Zemach Shabad (Tsemakh Shabad; 5 February 1864, Vilnius, Russian Empire (now Vilnius, Lithuania) — 20 January 1935, Vilnius) was a Jewish doctor and social and political activist. He was a member of the Senate (parliament) of the Second Polish Republic (1928) and a co-founder and vice-president of the YIVO (Institute for Jewish Research).
In 1932, Shabad toured to Palestine with Dr. Abel Lapin from Kaunas. During his trip, Shabad hosted by the Health Committee of the Knesset and the Jerusalem Medical Association.

He was one of the originators of the volkist movement, which eventually turned into the Folkspartei (Jewish People's Party).

In 2007, Zemach Shabad was honored with a monument in Vilnius, reflecting the fact that he was the prototype of "Doctor Aybolit", a good doctor from a children's poem by Korney Chukovsky.

Family
Regina, Mrs. Max Weinreich, daughter
Jacob Shabad, son
Josif Shabad, son
Uriel Weinreich, grandson, an American linguist
Gabriel Weinreich, grandson, expert in musical acoustics

References

External link

1864 births
1935 deaths
Politicians from Vilnius
People from Vilensky Uyezd
Lithuanian Jews
Jews from the Russian Empire
Folkspartei politicians
Senators of the Second Polish Republic (1928–1930)
History of YIVO
Members of the Grand Orient of Russia's Peoples
Imperial Moscow University alumni
Jewish physicians